Turleytown is an unincorporated community located in Rockingham County, in the U.S. state of Virginia.

Geography 
It is located west of Broadway, along State Route 613.

History 
Turleytown is believed to be named after Giles Turley who visited it in 1804.

References

Unincorporated communities in Rockingham County, Virginia
Unincorporated communities in Virginia